State Highway 26 (SH 26) is a  long state highway in Denver, Colorado, United States. It follows a portion of Alameda Avenue, stretching east from SH 95 (Sheridan Boulevard) at the west city limits to Kalamath Street within the Interstate 25 (I-25) and U.S. Route 85 (US 85) interchange (I-25 exit 208). It formerly continued west through Lakewood to US 40 near I-70 exit 259.

Route description

SH 26 is a four-to-six lane surface road, beginning at SH 95 and crossing SH 88 (Federal Boulevard) midway. Approaching the east end, it crosses the South Platte River just before the interchange with I-25. Kalamath Street, the end of state maintenance, is one-way southbound, providing access to US 85 south and I-25 south. One block later, Santa Fe Drive (one-way northbound) carries traffic from US 85 north and I-25 north, and leads to the onramp to I-25 north.

History
East of Morrison Road, Alameda Avenue was once part of SH 8, defined in 1923 along the modern US 285 corridor southwest of Denver. As part of a large expansion of the state highway system in 1938, existing SH 74 was extended from Morrison north along SH 93 (Hog Back Road) and east on Alameda Parkway and Alameda Avenue to end at Morrison Road. This extension was removed from the state highway system in 1953, along with most of the 1938 additions, but in 1966 it was restored as a new State Highway 26. Since the part of SH 93 along Hog Back Road had also been given back to the county in 1953, SH 26 went north from the west end of Alameda Parkway to end at US 40 just north of the present I-70 exit 259.

(SH 391 was simultaneously extended south from SH 26 to US 285.) The west segment was truncated to run only from US 40 to SH 470 between 1992 and 1997, and was eliminated entirely between 1999 and 2002. Alameda Parkway through Dinosaur Ridge between Hog Back Road and Rooney Road (west of SH 470) has since been closed to motor vehicles, but is open to bicycles and pedestrians as the Dinosaur Ridge Trail.

Major intersections

References

External links

Colorado Highways: Route 26

026
Transportation in Denver